Ramón Ros Badía (born 2 February 1981) is a Spanish retired footballer who played as a defensive midfielder.

Club career

Barcelona
Born in Barcelona, Catalonia, Ros reached local FC Barcelona's youth system in 2001. He spent two seasons with the reserves in the third division.

On 2 September 2003, Ros played his first and only La Liga match with the Blaugrana, replacing fellow youth graduate Óscar López in the dying minutes of a 1–1 home draw against Sevilla FC. He was loaned to CD Numancia for the following season and appeared much more (14 starts, 1,106 minutes of action), but his team was eventually relegated from the top flight.

Lleida
Ros returned to his native region in the 2005 off-season, joining UE Lleida of the second level. After two injury-ravaged campaigns – no league appearances in his second year, after suffering relegation in his first – he was forced to retire from football, at only 26.

References

External links
 

1981 births
Living people
Footballers from Barcelona
Spanish footballers
Association football midfielders
La Liga players
Segunda División players
Segunda División B players
Tercera División players
CF Damm players
CF Gavà players
FC Barcelona C players
FC Barcelona Atlètic players
FC Barcelona players
CD Numancia players
UE Lleida players